Oleksandra "Sasha" Sidorenko is a Ukrainian-born Polish professional boxer who held the European female lightweight title in 2017.

Professional career
Sidorenko made her professional debut on 18 April 2015, scoring a four-round unanimous decision (UD) victory against Bojana Libiszewska at the Arena Hall in Legionowo, Poland.

After compiling a record of 6–0 (1 KO), she defeated Isabelle Pare via UD to capture the vacant European female lightweight title on 30 September 2017, at the Hala ICDS in Łomianki, Poland, with the judges scorecards reading 100–90, 100–90 and 100–91.

After two-year maternity break, Sidorenko made her comeback on 19 October 2019, defeating Mayra Gomez via eight-round UD. Her next fight was a UD victory against Karina Kopinska in July 2020, bringing her record to 8–0 (1 KO).

Professional boxing record

References

External links

Living people
Date of birth missing (living people)
Year of birth missing (living people)
Sportspeople from Vinnytsia
Boxers from Warsaw
Ukrainian women boxers
Polish women boxers
Lightweight boxers
European Boxing Union champions
Ukrainian emigrants to Poland
Naturalized citizens of Poland